Eddie Vitch  (April 6, 1903 – September 1, 1986) was born in Skierniewice, Poland and made his way to the USA in the 1930s.  In 1931, he approached the Brown Derby owner Robert H. Cobb and offered to draw caricatures of the famous patrons who dined at the restaurant.

In a very short time, Eddie had drawn hundreds of pictures of Hollywood stars and the Brown Derby became famous for the caricatures which adorned it walls. For aspiring actors, having their caricature on the walls of the Brown Derby meant they had finally 'made it' in Hollywood. For Eddie Vitch it was to become his ticket into the world of entertainment.

By the 1940s, Eddie had created a comedy mime act and was traveling the world in variety theater alongside some very famous stars such as Edith Piaf, Maurice Chevalier and Josephine Baker.  His career took off during the 40s and 50s and he performed with the Folies Bergère, Paris, in the Berlin Wintergarten theatre, the Hippodrome, London and the Tivoli Gardens in Copenhagen.

He went on to perform his comedy shows on TV and had guest appearances in several movies. In 1966, he retired from theater life and moved to Australia.

In 2015 work commenced on a Documentary about Eddie Vitch's life.  It will be shown in cinemas around the world -  www.vitchmovie.com

References

External links

1903 births
1985 deaths
Polish emigrants to the United States
American artists